Hugo Tolentino Dipp (28 August 1930 – 15 July 2019) was a Dominican historian, politician, lawyer, educator, former Minister of Foreign Relations and President of the Chamber of Deputies of the Dominican Republic from 1982 to 1986.

Early life 
Born on 28 August 1930, the day on which General Rafael Trujillo was sworn in as President of the Dominican Republic, within an upper-class family of mixed-race background; his father, Vicente Tolentino Rojas, an intellectual and politician, who was minister and a friend of the recently ousted President Horacio Vásquez, had his residence in the National Palace; his mother, Catar 'Caterina' Dipp Attie, was a Lebanese-born socialité. He did his secondary studies at the High School Eugenio María de Hostos in 1948, later he graduated as Juris Doctor at the University of Santo Domingo in 1953; in addition to another title of Juris Doctor from the Central University of Madrid in 1954 and specializing in Public Law at the University of Paris in 1959 during his exile in Europe.

Career 

In 1960 he started as an assistant professor of "History of the West Indies during the nineteenth century" for the University of London, on his return in 1963 to the Dominican Republic was appointed professor at the Universidad Autónoma de Santo Domingo after getting through competition the chair of international law.

From that time he was an important pillar in the academic and administrative reform of that institution, in 1966 he was a member of the Committee on University Reform, in 1968 he was elected Academic Vice President, from 1970 to 1974 he was Professor of Sociology and Dominican Social History, and from 1974–1976 was rector thereof.

He married Evangelista Ligia Bonetti Guerra, sister of businessman José Miguel Bonetti Guerra, with whom he fathered his only begotten Beatriz Micaela, thereafter they divorced. He remarried to Sarah Bermúdez.

Death 

Dipp died on 15 July 2019, at the age of 88.

Literary works 
Source:

PhD thesis (University of Paris): "Orígenes Histórico-Jurídico de los Estados Dominicano y Haitiano"(1959)
El Fenómero Racial en Haití y la República Dominicana (1973)
Significado Histórico de la Fundación de la Ciudad de Santo Domingo de Guzmán
El Colegio Universitario y el Logro de una Educación Integral en la Universidad Autónoma de Santo Domingo
Discursos desde la Rectoría
Perfil Nacionalista de Gregorio Luperón
La Traición de Pedro Santana
Papel de la Universidad en la Sociedad Latinoaméricana Contemporánea
Orígenes del Prejuicio Racial contra el Indio en América
Raza e Historia en Santo Domingo
Gregorio Luperón: Biografía Política
La Reelección de Balaguer: Una Polémica (1977)
Pasado Presente y Futuro de Nuestra Constitución
El Congreso, las Leyes y la Participación Ciudadana
Les Orígenes du Prejugé Racial en Amérique Latíne (1984)
Historia de la Separación de Poderes en la República Dominicana (1985)
La Influencia de la Revolución Francesa en la República Dominicana (1989)
Los Mitos del Quinto Centenario (1992)
Vocablos (1997)
Itinerario Histórico de la Gastronomía Dominicana (2007)
Palabra Nueva (2009)

Awards and honours 
Source:
Gran Cruz de la Orden del Libertador San Martín, Argentina
Comandante de la Orden de la Legión de Honor, Francia
Gran Cruz Placa de la Orden del Mérito de Duarte, Sánchez y Mella, República Dominicana
Gran Cruz Placa de Plata de la Orden Heráldica de Cristóbal Colón, República Dominicana
Gran Cruz de la Orden del Mérito Civil, España
Orden del Mérito al Servicio Diplomático
Medalla Geum-gwan (Oro) de la Order of Cultural Merit, República de Corea (Sur)
Gran Cordón de la Order of Brilliant Star, República de China (Taiwán)
Gran Cruz Placa de Plata de la Orden Nacional José Matías Delgado, El Salvador
Gran Cruz Placa de Plata de la Orden Nacional Juan Mora Fernández, Costa Rica
Gran Oficial de la Order of Ouissam Alaouite, Marruecos
Gran Cruz de la Orden Nacional al Mérito, Ecuador
Gran Cruz de la Orden del Príncipe Yaroslav el Sabio, Ucrania
Gran Cruz de la Orden Nacional Honorato Vásquez, Ecuador
Gran Cruz de la Orden del Quetzal, Guatemala
Primera Clase (Gran Cruz) de la Orden Francisco de Miranda, Venezuela

References

External links 
 https://web.archive.org/web/20140820115340/http://www.escritoresdominicanos.com/tolentino.html
 http://www.diariolibre.com/noticias/2013/08/16/i398060_diputados-prd-eligen-radhamas-gonzalez.html
 https://web.archive.org/web/20150923195947/http://www.camaradediputados.gov.do/masterlex/MLX/docs/24/B/B6E9.htm
 http://www.destelao.com/index.php/sociales/actividades-eventos/4605-hugo-tolentino-dipp-pone-a-circular-poemario-en-academia-de-la-lengua-reconoce-su-timidez-por-dominicana

1930 births
2019 deaths
Government ministers of the Dominican Republic
Dominican Republic male writers
Presidents of the Chamber of Deputies of the Dominican Republic
Members of the Chamber of Deputies of the Dominican Republic
Dominican Republic people of Lebanese descent
Dominican Revolutionary Party politicians
Modern Revolutionary Party politicians
Foreign ministers of the Dominican Republic
Dominican Republic diplomats
Presidents of political parties in the Dominican Republic
Order of Civil Merit members
Academic staff of Universidad Autónoma de Santo Domingo